, also known as Biwa no daijin, was a Japanese statesman, courtier and politician during the Heian period.

In 945 he took tonsure as a Buddhist monk and died the same year. His Dharma name was Seikan (静寛).

Career at court
He was a minister during the reigns of Emperor Daigo and Emperor Suzaku.

 932 (Jōhei 2, 8th month): Nakahira was made udaijin.
 945 (Tengyō 8, 9th month): Sadaijin Nakahira died; and he was posthumously honored by the emperor.

Genealogy
This member of the Fujiwara clan was the son of Fujiwara no Mototsune.  Nakahira's brothers were Fujiwara no Tokihira and Fujiwara no Tadahira.

Notes

References
 Brinkley, Frank and Dairoku Kikuchi. (1915). A History of the Japanese People from the Earliest Times to the End of the Meiji Era. New York: Encyclopædia Britannica. OCLC 413099
 Nussbaum, Louis-Frédéric and Käthe Roth. (2005).  Japan encyclopedia. Cambridge: Harvard University Press. ;  OCLC 58053128
 Titsingh, Isaac. (1834).  Annales des empereurs du Japon (Nihon Odai Ichiran).  Paris: Royal Asiatic Society, Oriental Translation Fund of Great Britain and Ireland. OCLC 5850691 

875 births
945 deaths
Fujiwara clan
People of Heian-period Japan
Heian period Buddhist clergy